Prusy may refer to:

 Prusy, Aube, France
 Prusy, Bánovce nad Bebravou, Slovakia
Prusy, Greater Poland Voivodeship (west-central Poland)
Prusy, Lesser Poland Voivodeship (south Poland)
Prusy, Łódź Voivodeship (central Poland)
Prusy, Lower Silesian Voivodeship (south-west Poland)
Prusy, Grójec County in Masovian Voivodeship (east-central Poland)
Prusy, Łosice County in Masovian Voivodeship (east-central Poland)
Prusy, Mińsk County in Masovian Voivodeship (east-central Poland)
Prusy, Warsaw West County in Masovian Voivodeship (east-central Poland)
Prusy, Busko County in Świętokrzyskie Voivodeship (south-central Poland)
Prusy, Opatów County in Świętokrzyskie Voivodeship (south-central Poland)
Prusy, Warmian-Masurian Voivodeship (north Poland)
 Prusy, the Polish name for Prussia